Metacerithiidae is an extinct family of fossil sea snails, marine gastropod molluscs in the superfamily Campaniloidea.

According to the taxonomy of the Gastropoda by Bouchet & Rocroi (2005) the family Metacerithiidae has no subfamilies.

Genera
Genera within the family Metacerithiidae include:
 † Diatrypesis Tomlin, 1929 
 † Metacerithium Cossmann, 1906 - the type genus
 † Nerineopsis Cossmann, 1906 
Synonyms
 † Terebrella Andreae, 1887 : synonym of † Diatrypesis Tomlin, 1929  (invalid: junior homonym of Terebrella Maltzan, 1887; Trypetes Tomlin, 1929, is a replacement name)
 † Trypetes Tomlin, 1929 : synonym of † Diatrypesis Tomlin, 1929  (invalid: junior homonym of Trypetes Schenck, 1859; Diatrypesis is a replacement name)

References 

 Delpey, G. (1941). Gastéropodes marins. Paléontologie, stratigraphie. Mémoires de la Société Géologique de France. new ser., 19(3−4), Mémoire 43: 144 pp., 28 pls.

External links
 Cossmann, M. (1906). Essais de paléoconchologie comparée, Septième livraison. Paris, The author and de Rudeval. 261 pp., 14 pls.